1996 L.League Cup Final was the 1st final of the L.League Cup competition. The final was played at Nihondaira Sports Stadium in Shizuoka on July 7, 1996. Yomiuri-Seiyu Beleza won the championship.

Overview
Yomiuri-Seiyu Beleza won their 1st title, by defeating Prima Ham FC Kunoichi on a penalty shoot-out.

Match details

See also
1996 L.League Cup

References

Nadeshiko League Cup
1996 in Japanese women's football
Nadeshiko League Cup Final 1996